Abū al-Qāsim Alī ibn Jaʿfar ibn Alī ibn Muḥammad al-Saʿdī (c. 433–515 AH) (c. 1041–1121 AD), also known simply as Ibn al-Qatta' al-Siqilli was a renowned Arab philologist, lexicographer and anthologist of the Arabic language. His work is regarded as one of the major sources which preserve an abundance of knowledge about Arabic Sicilian poetry.

Biography 
Ibn al-Qatta' is dated to have been born on the 9th of October in the year 1041 AD (10 Ṣafar c. 433) in the island of Sicily, hence the nisba al-Siqilli. The island at the time was under the rule of the Kalbids' Emirate of Sicily. He was a descendant of the 9th-century rulers of Ifriqiya (Eastern Maghreb) the Aghlabids. The Aghlabids were the first Muslim dynasty to successfully seize control of the island of Sicily from the Byzantine Empire in 827. Ibn al-Qatta' came from a noble and learned family. For instance, his father, grandfather and great grandfather were all renowned for their interest in literature and knowledge. Ibn al-Qatta studied in Sicily under several scholars of the island and he composed an encyclopedia of the works of 170 Sicilian-Arab poets, by the title of al-Durra al-Khatira fi Shu'ara al-Jazira (The Precious Pearl on the Poets of the Island)

See also 

 List of pre-modern Arab scientists and scholars
 List of people from Sicily

References 

1041 births
1121 deaths
11th-century Arabs
12th-century Arabs
11th-century lexicographers
Lexicographers of Arabic
People from Sicily